Meshir 13 - Coptic Calendar - Meshir 15 

The fourteenth day of the Coptic month of Meshir, the sixth month of the Coptic year. In common years, this day corresponds to February 8, of the Julian Calendar, and February 21, of the Gregorian Calendar. This day falls in the Coptic Season of Shemu, the season of the Harvest.

Commemorations

Saints 

 The departure of Saint Severus, Patriarch of Antioch 
 The departure of Pope James, the 50th Patriarch of the See of Saint Mark

References 

Days of the Coptic calendar